Alameda (unofficially Estación Central) is a major railway station in Santiago, Chile, serving the south of the country, and is the city's primary and railway station, and is the only major railway station in Santiago after the closure of Mapocho, which used to cater trains to northern Chile. It is on the Avenida Libertador General Bernardo O'Higgins, facing Matucana avenue.

Overview
It opened in 1885, with the building designed by Gustave Eiffel in 1897, and its metallic structure built by the French firm Schneider of Le Creusot. It was declared a National Monument in 1983 by the government, protected by law against being demolished or remodeled. It has long been a reference point for travellers and locals; it is so well known that it gave the name to the municipality and commune where it is located, Estación Central.

It has experienced a revival as the government railway Empresa de los Ferrocarriles del Estado has been modernized to restore the bygone appeal for train travel. These efforts have met with moderate success.

It is an important hub for public transportation, with the underground Santiago Metro Line 1 Estación Central metro station and three intercity bus terminals within walking distance. Many local bus lines stop at the station and a medium-sized shopping center is adjacent.

The nearby San Borja Bus Terminal is within walking distance and connected by a medium-sized complex of shopping centers.

The central gates of the station are a transfer point to the metro station.

Lines and trains 
The following lines and trains terminate here:

Red Sur EFE
TerraSur inter-city service (Alameda - Chillán)
Metrotrén Nos commuter service (Alameda - Nos)
Metrotrén Rancagua commuter/regional service (Alameda - Rancagua)
TerraSur Temuco inter-city service (Alameda - Temuco)
 Tren nocturno Santiago-Concepción inter-city service (Alameda - Concepción)
Ramal Cartagena
FEPASA freight transport

Surroundings
University of Santiago
San Borja Bus Terminal
Estación Central metro station
Mall Plaza Alameda (shopping center)
Falabella, Ripley, La Polar & Johnsons retail stores.
Paseo Arauco Estación (shopping center)
Almacenes París and Fashion's Park retail stores, Sodimac (warehouse store).
Cinemundo, a 6 screens Movie theater.
Planetarium "Universidad de Santiago".

Adjacent stations

Gallery

References 

Station History

External links

 Empresa de los Ferrocarriles del Estado
 Metrotrén

Central Station
Railway stations opened in 1885
Railway stations in Chile
Buildings and structures in Santiago